Munster was a constituency of the European Parliament in Ireland between 1979 and 2004. It elected 5 Members of the European Parliament (MEPs) in the elections of 1979, 1984 and 1989 and 4 MEPs in the 1994 and 1999 elections using the single transferable vote form of proportional representation (PR-STV).

History and boundaries
The constituency was created in 1979 for the first direct elections to the European Parliament. It comprised County Clare, County Cork, County Kerry, County Limerick, County Tipperary and County Waterford from the historic province of Munster including the cities of Cork, Limerick and Waterford. It was abolished under the European Parliament Elections (Amendment) Act 2004 and succeeded by the new South constituency.

MEPs

Elections

1999 election

All sitting MEPs were re-elected.

1994 election

The constituency lost a seat and T. J. Maher and Gene Fitzgerald retired. Pat Cox resigned from the Progressive Democrats (PD) but succeeded in narrowly beating the PD leader Desmond O'Malley for the last seat.

1989 election

Tom Raftery of Fine Gael lost his seat to Pat Cox of the Progressive Democrats.

1984 election

Eileen Desmond (substituted by Seán Treacy in 1981) lost the Labour Party seat to Fine Gael, while Noel Davern lost his seat to his Fianna Fáil running mates.

1979 election

See also
 European Parliament constituencies in the Republic of Ireland

References

European Parliament constituencies in the Republic of Ireland (historic)
Munster
1979 establishments in Ireland
2004 disestablishments in Ireland
Constituencies established in 1979
Constituencies disestablished in 2004